Kaisersee is a lake in Augsburg, Schwaben, Bavaria, Germany. Its surface area is 4 ha.

Lakes of Bavaria